Zheng Yuanjie (born 15 June 1955) is a Chinese children's books author, and founder and sole writer of a children's literature magazine known as the King of Fairy Tales. The first issue was published in 1984. His characters (including PiPilu, LuXixi, Shuke, Beita and Luoke) are registered trademarks.

View
Zheng Yuanjie is critical of conventional Chinese methods of education, claiming that "college education tends to make simple things complicated and hard to understand".

References

Living people
1955 births
Chinese male writers
People's Republic of China writers
Charter 08 signatories
Chinese children's writers
People from Shijiazhuang
Writers from Hebei
Writers from Beijing